Events from the year 1973 in Sweden

Incumbents
 Monarch – Gustaf VI Adolf (died September 15), then Carl XVI Gustaf
 Prime Minister – Olof Palme

Events

 11 May – The Data Act (Sw. Datalagen) − the world's first national data protection law − is enacted in Sweden.
 23–28 August - Norrmalmstorg robbery - a bank robbery and hostage crisis best known as the origin of the term Stockholm syndrome. 
 15 September – King Gustaf VI Adolf dies in his 91st year. He's succeeded by his 27-year-old grandson, Carl XVI Gustaf.
 16 September – 1973 Swedish general election.

Births
 23 January – Tomas Holmström, ice hockey player.
 20 July – Peter Forsberg, ice hockey player.

Deaths

 4 August – Gustav Freij, wrestler, Olympic champion in 1948 (born 1922).
 7 September – Ernst Casparsson, horse rider (born 1886).
 15 September – Gustaf VI Adolf, king (born 1882).

References

 
Sweden
Years of the 20th century in Sweden